"Hotel California" is a song by the Eagles.

Hotel California may also refer to:

 Hotel California (Eagles album), the Eagles album that includes their song of the same name
 Hotel California, a hotel built in 1947 in Todos los Santos, Baja California Sur, Mexico
 Hotel California (2008 film), an American film
 Hotel California (Tyga album), a 2013 album
 Hotel California (2013 film), an Indian film

See also 
 Hotel Californian (disambiguation)
 California Hotel and Casino, Las Vegas, Nevada, U.S.
 Motel California, a 1996 album by Ugly Kid Joe
 Hotel Kalifornia, a 2022 album by Hollywood Undead